The 2006 African Volleyball Championship U19 was the eighth edition of the African Volleyball Championship U19. It was held in Kelibia, Tunisia, from August 20 to August 22, 2006. The top two teams will qualify for the 2007 Youth World Championship.

Teams

Competition system
The competition system of the 2006 African Championship U19 is the single Round-Robin system. Each team plays once against each of the 2 remaining teams. Points are accumulated during the whole tournament, and the final ranking is determined by the total points gained.

Championship

|}

Results

|}

Final standing

References

External links
CAVB Official website

African Volleyball Championship U19
African Volleyball Championship U19
African Volleyball Championship U19
International volleyball competitions hosted by Tunisia
African Volleyball Championships
August 2006 sports events in Africa